Val-Joli is a municipality in Quebec, Canada.

Demographics

Population

Language
Mother tongue (2011)

Notable residents
Christian Savoie, (born 1976 in Val-Joli), winner of Canada's Strongest Man and entrant to the World's Strongest Man competition.

See also
List of municipalities in Quebec

References

External links
 

Municipalities in Quebec
Incorporated places in Estrie